Acacia polystachya is a tree belonging to the genus Acacia and the subgenus Juliflorae that is native to north eastern Australia.

Description
It has smooth to pustular, flattened or angular branchlets that are grey, brown or purplish in colour. Like most species of Acacia it has phyllodes rather than true leaves. The narrowly elliptic phyllodes are sometimes asymmetrical and stright to sickle shaped. It blooms between April and July producing yellow flowers. The thinly coriaceous blackish seed pods that form after flowering have a linear shape and are straight-sided to slightly and often constricted between seeds and covered in a powdery white coating.

Taxonomy 
The species was first formally described by the botanist Allan Cunningham in 1842 as part of William Jackson Hooker's work Notes on Mimoseae, with a synopsis of species published in the London Journal of Botany. It was reclassified by Leslie Pedley in 1987 as Racosperma polystachyum then transferred back to genus Acacia in 2001.

Distribution
It is endemic to the parts of far north and northern Queensland in areas along the east coast. The northern range of the tree extends as far north as Banks Island in the Torres Strait down to along the eastern side of Cape York Peninsula to around Cairns in the south and has also been found on Palm Island. It is found along beaches and creeks and rivers where it grows in alluvial soils often as a part of vine thicket communities.

See also
List of Acacia species

References

polystachya
Flora of Queensland
Taxa named by Allan Cunningham (botanist)
Plants described in 1842